Flippases (rarely spelled flipases) are transmembrane lipid transporter proteins located in the membrane which belong to ABC transporter or P4-type ATPase families. They are responsible for aiding the movement of phospholipid molecules between the two leaflets that compose a cell's membrane (transverse diffusion, also known as a "flip-flop" transition). The possibility of active maintenance of an asymmetric distribution of molecules in the phospholipid bilayer was predicted in the early 1970s by Mark Bretscher. Although phospholipids diffuse rapidly in the plane of the membrane, their polar head groups cannot pass easily through the hydrophobic center of the bilayer, limiting their diffusion in this dimension. Some flippases - often instead called scramblases - are energy-independent and bidirectional, causing reversible equilibration of phospholipid between the two sides of the membrane, whereas others are energy-dependent and unidirectional, using energy from ATP hydrolysis to pump the phospholipid in a preferred direction. Flippases are described as transporters that move lipids from the exoplasmic to the cytosolic face, while floppases transport in the reverse direction.

Many cells maintain asymmetric distributions of phospholipids between their cytoplasmic and exoplasmic membrane leaflets. The loss of asymmetry, in particular the appearance of the anionic phospholipid phosphatidylserine on the exoplasmic face, can serve as an early indicator of apoptosis and as a signal for efferocytosis.

See also
Scramblase

References

Integral membrane proteins